Appointment with Death is the sixth studio album by the American heavy metal band Lizzy Borden, released in October 2007 via Metal Blade Records.

Track listing
 "Abnormal" (Mårten Andersson, Lizzy Borden, Joey Scott Harges) - 5:12
 "Appointment with Death" (Andersson, Borden, Scott) - 3:47
 "Live Forever" (Andersson, Ira Black, Borden, Scott) - 5:01
 "Bloody Tears" (Andersson, Black, Borden, Scott) - 4:48
 "The Death of Love" (Andersson, Black, Borden, Scott) - 5:17
 "Tomorrow Never Comes" (Andersson, Black, Borden, Scott) - 4:22
 "Under Your Skin" (Borden) - 5:06
 "Perfect World (I Don’t Wanna Live)" (Andersson, Black, Borden, Scott) - 4:53
 "Somthin’s Crawlin'" (Andersson, Borden, Scott) - 5:43
 "(We Are) the Only Ones" (Andersson, Black, Borden, Scott) - 4:01
 "The Darker Side" (Borden) - 5:22
 "Tomorrow Never Comes" (Acoustic Version) - 4:18 (Japanese Edition bonus track)

Personnel
Lizzy Borden
Lizzy Borden - vocals, producer
Ira Black - guitars
Mårten Andersson - bass
Joey Scott Harges - drums, producer, engineer

Additional musicians
Adam Cameron - guitars on "Abnormal" and "Appointment with Death"
Corey Beaulieu - lead guitar on "Abnormal"
Jonas Hansson - lead guitar and keyboards on "Appointment with Death"
George Lynch - lead guitar on "The Death of Love"
Zane - guitar on "Under Your Skin", "Somethin's Crawlin" and "The Darker Side"
Erik Rutan - lead guitar on "Somethin's Crawlin", mixing at Mana Sound, Florida
Dave Meniketti - lead guitar on "The Darker Side"
Michael T Ross - keyboards
Marliese Mildenberger - keyboards on "Under Your Skin"

References

Lizzy Borden (band) albums
2007 albums
Metal Blade Records albums